Blind Justice is an American crime drama television series created by Steven Bochco about a blind New York City police detective. It was introduced mid-season on March 8, 2005, to fill the time slot left by Bochco's highly successful NYPD Blue, which had just aired its final episode after a 12-year run. The show ran for only one season, with 13 episodes broadcast.

Plot
A New York City police detective named Jim Dunbar and his partner are ambushed by a gunman with an AK-47. Three other officers are out of ammunition, and Dunbar's partner is frozen in fear. Dunbar takes action but also takes a bullet leaving him blind. He sues the police force and is allowed to keep his job despite his blindness. He is partnered with Detective Karen Bettancourt who doubts his ability to effectively do his job. He also must deal with self-doubt and his wife Christie's doubts by seeing a psychiatrist.

Cast
 Ron Eldard as Detective Jim Dunbar
 Marisol Nichols as Detective Karen Bettancourt
 Rena Sofer as Christie Dunbar
 Reno Wilson as Detective Tom Selway
 Frank Grillo as Detective Marty Russo
 Michael Gaston as Lt. Gary Fisk
 Saul Rubinek as Dr. Alan Galloway

Production
Blind Justice is a co-production of Steven Bochco Productions and Paramount Television. In 2003 during early pre-production on the then-untitled series Bochco said of Blind Justice, "it ain't like any cop show you've ever seen before." Bochco said he got the idea for the series from seeing The Blind Boys of Alabama at a concert in Hollywood and noticing how they came on stage in a line, each holding on to the shoulder of the man in front of him. On May 18, 2004, ABC announced that they had ordered Blind Justice as a mid-season replacement to fill the spot in their scheduled left by NYPD Blue which was to end part way through the 2004-05 television season. The start of production on the series in Los Angeles was announced on October 25, 2004.

The main setting of the series is the police precinct in New York City's Chinatown. Exterior shots were filmed at a precinct in Brooklyn. The pilot was filmed in part on location in New York and on the stages of 20th Century Fox and on the streets of Los Angeles. The pilot episode had its first public screening in mid-January, 2005 at the Mall of America in Minneapolis, Minnesota as part of ABC's attempt to promote their mid-season schedule. The other shows premiering were Grey's Anatomy, Eyes, Supernanny, and Jake in Progress.

Kramer Morgenthau was the cinematographer for the pilot and together with director Gary Fleder established the basic visual presentation of Blind Justice. For the series Bochco employed two cinematographers, Jeff Jur and Ric Bota, who worked on alternate episodes to allow for more time to visually develop the individual episodes. Blind Justice was the first scripted series to be broadcast on ABC with video description for the visually impaired, where available (FCC regulations for Descriptive Video Service would not come into force for seven more years).

Reception
Kevin D. Thompson of Cox News Service said Blind Justice is "worth your attention mostly because of Ron Eldard's standout performance as Dunbar", a character whom he described as "one of TV's most intriguing new characters." Vikki Ortiz of the Milwaukee Journal Sentinel watched the premiere with members of the Badger Association of the Blind and Visually Impaired in Milwaukee and found that generally they considered it a realistic portrayal of what it is like to be blind, citing use of proper commands being given to his guide dog and having Detective Bettancourt lead him with her arm. Ortiz mentioned that several people did say that it was unrealistic that he would be allowed to carry a gun. In her review of the pilot Alessandra Stanley of The New York Times found that Blind Justice "is at its best when portraying how people react to the character Jim Dunbar". Stanley goes on to say in her review that "the scenes at the precinct when he first returns to work are intelligently and delicately written. His heroism, and the groundbreaking lawsuit he filed, turned him into a celebrity cop, and his colleagues on the force greet him with graceless courtesy and palpable resentment. Dunbar is blind, but in a previous generation, he could have been black or female and encountered a similar kind of churlishness."

Robert Bianco of USA Today was less receptive to Blind Justice. Bianco wrote a column solely on concepts worse than Blind Justice, of which he said, "As bad ideas go, Blind Justice's gun-toting blind guy isn't even a patch on some of the truly awful concepts that have made it to series." Matthew Gilbert of The Boston Globe said Detective Dunbar "might as well be wearing a note pinned to his back reading 'I have courage, integrity, and kids really like me.'" Gilbert goes on to say that Blind Justice "settles for the sort of nobler than-thou portrayal that marred the final seasons of Bochco's NYPD Blue." He concludes his review by saying, "In the episodes sent to critics, the murder suspects are straight out of central casting, from the wigged-out serial killer to the abusive dad. Ultimately, they seem to be there merely to provide our knight in shining armor a few hard-to-miss targets." Samantha Force of The Michigan Daily said that the idea of a disabled cop returning to work was believable but that a blind cop can carry a loaded gun simply by signing a liability waiver is ridiculous. Force concedes that the show does point out its own flaws with the premise by having Dunbar's coworkers express concerns about his ability to use his gun if the need arose. Force concluded her review by saying, "this show is a good watch if the viewer is able to suspend their disbelief and take the premise at face value. For those viewers out there who want their dosage of realism in drama, Blind Justice is not the pill for you."

Episodes
Blind Justice was broadcast on Tuesdays at 10:00 pm on ABC. The series finale was shown on the west coast June 21, 2005, after game 6 of the 2005 NBA Finals. As it was a regional broadcast there are no national ratings available for the episode.  The series briefly had a syndicated run on Sleuth Channel in 2009.

International broadcasters

References

External links
 

2000s American crime drama television series
2005 American television series debuts
2005 American television series endings
American Broadcasting Company original programming
English-language television shows
Fictional portrayals of the New York City Police Department
Television series by CBS Studios
Television shows set in New York City
Television shows about blind people
Television series created by Steven Bochco